The DeKalb Superspiel is a curling bonspiel that takes place at the Morris Curling Club in Morris, Manitoba. It was an event on the World Curling Tour until 2019 and the Manitoba Curling Tour, and also takes part in the Canadian Team Ranking System (CTRS). There is a men's and women's event. The event began in 2009 and is annually held usually the third weekend in November but is subject to changes if the WCT or MCA has a conflicting bonspiel.

Past champions
Only skip's name is displayed.

Men

Women

References

External links
DEKALB Superspiel official page
DEKALB Superspiel @ Manitoba Curling Tour

Morris, Manitoba
Curling in Manitoba
Pembina Valley Region